Fifty-two countries have participated in the Eurovision Song Contest since it started in 1956. Winners of the contest have come from twenty-seven of those countries. The contest, organised by the European Broadcasting Union (EBU), is held annually between members of the union. Broadcasters from different countries submit songs to the event and cast votes to determine the most popular in the competition.

Participation in the contest is primarily open to all broadcasters with active EBU membership. To become an active member of the EBU, a broadcaster has to be from a country which is covered by the European Broadcasting Area or a member state of the Council of Europe. Eligibility to participate is not determined by geographic inclusion within the continent of Europe, despite the "Euro" in "Eurovision", nor does it have a direct connection with the European Union. Several countries geographically outside the boundaries of Europe have competed: Israel, Cyprus, and Armenia, in Western Asia, since 1973, 1981 and 2006 respectively; Morocco, in North Africa, in the 1980 competition alone; and Australia making a debut in the 2015 contest. In addition, several transcontinental countries with only part of their territory in Europe have competed: Turkey, since 1975; Russia, since 1994; Georgia, since 2007; and Azerbaijan, which made its first appearance in the 2008 edition. Two of the countries that have previously sought to enter the competition, Lebanon and Tunisia, in Western Asia and North Africa respectively, are also outside of Europe. The Persian Gulf state of Qatar, in Western Asia, announced in 2009 its interest in joining the contest in time for the 2011 edition. However, this did not materialise, and there are no known plans for a future Qatari entry the Eurovision Song Contest. Australia, where the contest has been broadcast since the 1970s, has participated every year since its debut in 2015.

The number of countries participating each year has grown steadily, from seven in 1956 to over twenty in the late 1980s. A record 43 countries participated in 2008, 2011 and 2018. As the number of contestants has risen, preliminary competitions and relegation have been introduced, to ensure that as many countries as possible get the chance to compete. In 1993, a preliminary show, Kvalifikacija za Millstreet ("Qualification for Millstreet"), was held to select three Eastern European countries to compete for the first time at the main contest. After the 1993 contest, a relegation rule was introduced; the six lowest-placed countries in the contest would not compete in the following year. In 1996, a new system was introduced. Audiotapes of all twenty-nine entrants were submitted to national juries. The twenty-two highest-placed songs after the juries voted reached the contest. Norway, as the host country, directly qualified for the final. From 1997 to 2001, a system was used whereby the countries with the lowest average scores over the previous five years were relegated. Countries could not be relegated for more than one year at a time.

The relegation system used in 1994 and 1995 was reused between 2001 and 2003. In 2004, a semi-final was introduced. The ten highest-placed countries in the previous year's contest qualified for the final, along with the "Big Four", the largest financial contributors to the EBU. All other countries entered the semi-final. Ten countries qualified from the semi, composing a final of twenty-four. Since 2008, two semi-finals are held with all countries, except the host country and the "Big Four" or "Big Five" (after Italy's return in 2011), participating in one of the semi-finals.

Some countries, such as Germany, France, Belgium and the United Kingdom, have entered most years, while Morocco has only entered once. Two countries, Tunisia and Lebanon, have attempted to enter the contest but withdrew before making a debut.

Participants 

Shading indicates countries that have withdrawn from the contest or former participants that are unable to compete in future contests. Yugoslavia and Serbia and Montenegro were both dissolved, in 1991 and 2006 respectively. Serbia and Montenegro participated in the 1992 contest as the Federal Republic of Yugoslavia which consisted of only the two republics. Both Montenegro and Serbia have competed as separate countries since 2007. The Belarusian broadcaster BTRC was expelled from the EBU in July 2021, preventing them from competing in future editions of the contest, or any EBU event until 2024. Following the 2022 Russian invasion of Ukraine and subsequent exclusion of Russia from the 2022 contest, the Russian broadcasters VGTRK and Channel One announced their intention to withdraw their EBU membership in February 2022 and were suspended from the union in May, preventing Russia from competing in future editions of the contest, or any EBU event for an indefinite period of time.

Other countries
The following countries have been eligible to participate in the contest, but have never done so.

  – EPTV, ENRS, TDA
  – ČST (1991–1992, dissolved)
  – ERTU
  – JRTV
  – TL
  – LJBC (1974–2011),  LNC (2011–present)
  – RTT
  – RV

Algeria, Egypt, Jordan, Lebanon, Libya and Tunisia have broadcasters that are members of both the EBU and the Arab States Broadcasting Union. Although they could participate, it is believed that they refuse to do so due to the ongoing participation of Israel. Vatican City could participate through its member broadcaster Vatican Radio (RV), which was also a founding member of the EBU, though RV only broadcasts papal events, and the population is less than 900the vast majority of whom are clergy. Following the dissolution of Czechoslovakia in 1993, Slovakia and the Czech Republic made their debut as independent states in 1994 and 2007 respectively.

Participating countries by decade 
The table lists the participating countries in each decade since the first Eurovision Song Contest was held in 1956.

Seven countries participated in the first contest. Since then, the number of entries has increased steadily. In 1961, 3 countries debuted, Finland, Spain and Yugoslavia, joining the 13 already included. Yugoslavia will become the only socialist country to participate in the following three decades. In 1970, a Nordic-led boycott of the contest reduced the number of countries entering to twelve. By the late 1980s, over twenty countries had become standard.

In 1993, the collapse of the USSR in Eastern Europe and the subsequent merger of EBU and OIRT gave many new countries the opportunity to compete. Three countries—Croatia, Slovenia and Bosnia and Herzegovina, all of them former Yugoslav republics—won through from a pre-qualifier to compete. After the 1993 event, a relegation system was introduced, allowing even more Eastern European countries to compete: seven more made their debut in 1994.

In 2003, three countries applied to make their debut: Albania, Belarus and Ukraine. In addition, Serbia and Montenegro, who had not competed since 1992, applied to return. The EBU, having originally accepted the four countries' applications, later rejected all but Ukraine; allowing four extra countries to compete would have meant relegating too many countries. The semi-final was introduced in 2004 in an attempt to prevent situations like this. The Union set a limit of forty countries, but by 2005 thirty-nine were competing. In 2007, the EBU lifted the limit, allowing forty-two countries to compete. Two semi-finals were held for the first time in 2008.

1956–1959

1960–1969

1970–1979

1980–1989

1990–1999

2000–2009

2010–2019

2020–2023

Other countries and territories 
A number of broadcasters in non-participating countries and territories have in the past indicated an interest in participating in the Eurovision Song Contest. For broadcasters to participate, they must be a member of the EBU and register their intention to compete before the deadline specified in the rules of that year's event. Each participating broadcaster pays a fee towards the organisation of the contest. Should a country withdraw from the contest after the deadline, they will still need to pay these fees, and may also incur a fine or temporary ban.

China 
China aired the Eurovision Song Contest 2015 and then Chinese provincial television channel Hunan Television had confirmed its interest in participating in the Eurovision Song Contest 2016. The EBU had responded saying "we are open and are always looking for new elements in each Eurovision Song Contest". However, on 3 June 2015, the EBU denied that China would participate as a guest or full participant in 2016.

During the Chinese broadcast of the first 2018 semi-final on Mango TV, both Albania and Ireland were edited out of the show, along with their snippets in the recap of all 19 entries. Albania was skipped due to a ban that took effect in January 2018 prohibiting showing on television performers with tattoos while Ireland was censored due to its representation of a homosexual couple on-stage. In addition, the LGBT flag and tattoos on other performers were also blurred out from the broadcast. As a result, the EBU has terminated its partnership with Mango TV, citing that censorship "is not in line with the EBU's values of universality and inclusivity and its proud tradition of celebrating diversity through music," which led to a ban on televising the second semi-final and the grand final in the country. A spokesperson for the broadcaster's parent company Hunan TV said they "weren't aware" of the edits made to the programme.

Faroe Islands 

Since 2010, the Faroese national broadcaster Kringvarp Føroya (KVF) has been attempting to gain EBU membership and thus participate independently in the Eurovision Song Contest. However, KVF cannot obtain EBU membership due to the islands being a constituent part of the Danish Realm.

In late 2018, KVF showed renewed interest in joining the EBU and participating in the contest. According to the broadcaster, they are not excluded by the rule that only independent nations can join, and as a result, the Faroese broadcaster started internal discussions on applying for EBU membership and participating in the contest, and even organising a national final similar to the Dansk Melodi Grand Prix.

Gibraltar 
Since 2006, Gibraltarian broadcaster Gibraltar Broadcasting Corporation (GBC) has been attempting to gain EBU membership and thus participate independently in the Eurovision Song Contest. However, GBC cannot obtain EBU membership due to the British Overseas Territory not being independent from the United Kingdom.

Kazakhstan 

Kazakhstan has never participated in the Eurovision Song Contest. Kazakhstan is negotiating to join the European Broadcasting Union. The state television company (K-1) has been hoping for pending or approved EBU membership since 2008. If this happens, they may be eligible to compete in the Eurovision Song Contest. Nevertheless, they have broadcast the Eurovision Song Contests from  onwards. However, according to the EBU, no Kazakh broadcaster has ever formally applied to join the EBU.

On 18 December 2015, it was announced that Khabar Agency, a major media outlet in Kazakhstan, had been accepted into the EBU as an associate member, but were still not eligible to take part in the contest under the current rules. Only countries who are part of the European Broadcasting Area are eligible to participate, with Australia being the only exception after being an associate member for over 30 years.

On 22 December 2017, Channel 31 announced that they planned to debut in the 2019 contest, due to their newfound EBU membership.

Kazakhstan made its debut at the Junior Eurovision Song Contest 2018 alongside , placing sixth. On 30 July 2018, the EBU stated that the decision to invite Kazakhstan was made solely by the Junior Eurovision Steering Group, and there were no current plans to invite associate members other than Australia.

On 22 November 2018, Jon Ola Sand said in a press conference that "we need to discuss if we can invite our associate member Kazakhstan to take part in the adult ESC in the future, but this is part of a broader discussion in the EBU and I hope we can get back to you on this issue later." However, shortly after he clarified that they would not have an entry in the 2019 edition.

Kosovo 

Kosovo has never participated in the Eurovision Song Contest on its own, but the contest has had a long history within the country which has broadcast it since 1961, and after the start of Kosovo's UN administration, the Kosovan public broadcaster RTK has been independently licensed by the EBU to broadcast all three shows. Despite not having participated at the song contest, Kosovo did participate in the Eurovision Young Dancers 2011.

As Kosovo is not part of the United Nations and RTK not part of the International Telecommunication Union, RTK cannot apply to become a full member of the EBU.

Jugovizija was the national pre-selection of Yugoslavia organised by the Yugoslav broadcaster Yugoslav Radio Television (JRT) since 1961 and it featured entries submitted by the subnational public broadcasting centres based in the capitals of each of the constituent republics and autonomous provinces. Each broadcasting centre had its own regional jury. SAP Kosovo was represented by RTV Priština, but their entry has never won. Jugovizija 1986 was organised by RTV Priština. Numerous Kosovo Serb singers have participated in  organised by RTS.

There is a co-operation agreement signed between the EBU and RTK and the EBU supports the membership of RTK. From 2013 on, RTK has observer status within the EBU and did participate in the Eurovision Young Dancers 2011. According to the Kosovan newspaper Koha Ditore, a possible entry would be selected via a national final called Akordet e Kosovës, a former pop show that had been taken off the air some years ago.

Lebanon 

Lebanon has never participated in the Eurovision Song Contest. The country's broadcasting organisation, Télé Liban, was set to make the country's debut at the Eurovision Song Contest 2005 with the song "Quand tout s'enfuit" performed by Aline Lahoud, but withdrew due to Lebanon's laws banning the broadcast of Israeli content.

Liechtenstein 

Liechtenstein has never participated in the Eurovision Song Contest, with the principality being prevented from competing due to a lack of a national broadcaster which is a member of the EBU. Attempts were made in the 1970s by the Liechtenstein government for the nation to participate, with a two-song national final held in November 1975 choosing "My Little Cowboy" sung by Biggi Bachmann and written by Mike Tuttlies and Horst Hornung as the winner over "Tu étais mon clown" by Anne Frommelt.

On 15 August 2008, 1 FL TV, licensed by Liechtenstein's government, became the first broadcaster based in Liechtenstein. This would allow the country to begin competing at the Eurovision Song Contest for the first time, should they decide to join the EBU, a pre-requisite for entering the contest. Shortly after its foundation however, the broadcaster announced that they were not interested in joining the EBU or Eurovision at that time because they had no budget for membership.

In July 2009, the broadcaster officially announced its intent to apply to join the EBU by the end of July, with the intent of taking part at the Eurovision Song Contest 2010, to be held in Oslo, Norway. Peter Kölbel, managing director of 1FLTV, officially confirmed the broadcaster's interest, revealing that they had plans to develop a national final similar to Deutschland sucht den Superstar, the German version of the Idol series. In November 2009, 1FLTV decided to postpone EBU and Eurovision plans, due to financial reasons began to search for other options for funding EBU membership in the future.

1FLTV submitted its application for EBU membership on 29 July 2010. If accepted, 1FLTV would have gained full EBU membership and would have been able to send an entry to the Eurovision Song Contest 2011. However, Liechtenstein did not appear on the official list of participants for Eurovision 2011. In late 2012, Peter Kölbel, director of 1FLTV, stated that Liechtenstein would not be able to take part until 2013 at the earliest. The broadcaster had been trying to get government subsidies since 2010 to enable participation, participation was likely if the Government approved funding by April 2012.

On 10 September 2013, 1FLTV confirmed that Liechtenstein would not be participating at the Eurovision Song Contest 2014 in Copenhagen, Denmark. The broadcaster has no plans to join the EBU at the moment. This was confirmed again on 28 July 2014 in the run-up to the Eurovision Song Contest 2015 in Austria. 1FLTV did however state their interest in participating in the Eurovision Song Contest, but that they have to evaluate the costs of EBU membership, a necessary prelude to participation. The nation was not able to make its début in 2016, due to lack of funds to join the EBU. On 21 September 2016, 1FLTV announced that they would not be able to debut to the contest in 2017, but that they would set their eyes on a future participation once they overcome their financial hurdles. Yet again, on 1 September 2017 they also announced they would not debut at the 2018 contest in Lisbon.

On 4 November 2017, the broadcaster stated that it was planning to debut in the Eurovision Song Contest in 2019 and would organise a national selection to select both the singer and the song. However, on 20 July 2018, the EBU stated that 1 FL TV have not applied for membership. The broadcaster later halted its plans to apply for EBU membership when its director, Peter Kölbel, unexpectedly died. It would also need the backing of the Liechtenstein government to be able to carry the cost of becoming an EBU member and paying the participation fee for the contest.

On 9 August 2022, 1 FL TV's managing director Sandra Woldt confirmed that the broadcaster would not be aiming to apply for EBU membership, therefore indefinitely ruling out a debut in the Eurovision Song Contest.

Qatar 
Qatar Radio (QR) was an associate member of the EBU in 2009, but was removed sometime later. The broadcaster first revealed on 12 May 2009 that they were interested in becoming active members of the union, which would allow the nation to compete in the contest. Qatar Radio has stated that they hope to join Eurovision by 2011. Qatar first became involved in the contest at the 2009 edition, where the broadcaster sent a delegation to the contest and broadcast a weekly radio show called '12pointsqatar' dedicated to Eurovision, which received favourable responses and has initiated the further involvement of Qatar in Eurovision. Qatar Radio has said that they feel that they would be happy to join all other competitors in the contest, including Israel if Qatar receives a membership.

Qatar is required to have a broadcaster which has at least associate membership of the EBU in order to have a chance to take part, as Qatar Radio is only a radio station and Qatar lies outside the European Broadcasting Area and cannot apply for Council of Europe membership, with Australia being the only exception after being an associate member for over 30 years. The broadcaster would most likely be Qatar Television (QTV) also owned and run by the Qatar General Broadcasting and Television Corporation (QGBTC). If Qatar Radio gets accepted, then they would be able to air the contest alongside the television broadcast.

Scotland 

However, they did not progress beyond the semi-final. This was the first time Scotland has competed separately from the United Kingdom in a Eurovision event.

Soviet Union 
The Soviet Union never participated in the Eurovision Song Contest, but it made several attempts in the late 1980s. In 2009, Eduard Fomin, a former employee of the Ministry of Education of the RSFSR, revealed that in 1987 George Veselov, the Minister of Education for the Soviet Union, brought forward the idea of Soviet participation in the Eurovision Song Contest due to the number of political reforms made by the General Secretary of the Communist Party of the Soviet Union Mikhail Gorbachev during the late 1980s. The idea was mainly a political one, with the thought that a win in the contest for the Soviet Union would impact on the relationships between the Soviet Union and the capitalist countries of the west. Valery Leontyev was suggested as a singer for the Soviet Union's first entry into the contest, but Veselov's ideas were not shared by the Communist Party of the Soviet Union, or by Gorbachev himself, believing it to be too radical a step to take, and so the Soviet Union never entered the contest before dissolving.

All former republics of the Soviet Union which were geographically situated in Europe (except Kazakhstan) would later compete in the contest on their own in the 1990s and 2000s: Russia, Estonia, Lithuania, Latvia, Ukraine, Belarus, Moldova, Armenia, Georgia, and Azerbaijan, with five of the countries going on to win one of the contests: Estonia, Latvia, Ukraine, Russia, and Azerbaijan.

Tunisia 
Tunisia attempted to enter the 1977 edition of the contest and was scheduled fourth in the running order, however, prior to selecting an act, the country withdrew for undisclosed reasons. It is believed that Tunisia's member broadcaster, Établissement de la radiodiffusion-télévision tunisienne (ERTT), did not want to compete with Israel. In 2007, ERTT clarified that it would not participate in the contest in the foreseeable future due to governmental requests.

Wales 

In the 1960s, the late Welsh singer, scholar and writer Meredydd Evans proposed that Wales should have its own entry in the Eurovision Song Contest. In 1969, Cân i Gymru was launched by BBC Cymru Wales as a selection show for the contest, with songs to be performed in Welsh. However, it was decided that the BBC would continue to send one entry for the whole of the United Kingdom. Despite this, Cân i Gymru has been broadcast every year since, with the exception of 1973. The winning song takes part in the annual Pan Celtic Festival in Ireland. Wales has appeared as an independent country in another EBU production, Jeux Sans Frontières and Welsh national broadcaster S4C has been encouraged to take part in the Junior Eurovision Song Contest. Wales is also eligible to take part in the minority language song contest Liet-Lávlut.

Wales announced on 9 May 2018 that they would debut at the Junior Eurovision Song Contest 2018 in Minsk, Belarus. They finished in last place with 29 points.

Broadcast in non-participating countries 
The contest has been broadcast in several countries that do not compete, such as the United States, Canada, New Zealand, and China. Since 2000, it has been broadcast online via the Eurovision website. It was also broadcast in several countries East of the Iron Curtain that have since dissolved, such as Czechoslovakia, East Germany, and the Soviet Union.

See also 
 List of countries in the Eurovision Young Dancers
 List of countries in the Eurovision Young Musicians
 List of countries in the Junior Eurovision Song Contest

Notes

References

Bibliography 
 O'Connor, John Kennedy (2005). The Eurovision Song Contest 50 Years The Official History. London: Carlton Books Limited. .

Eurovision Song Contest